Blue Veins is based in Peshawar, Khyber Pakhtunkhwa, Pakistan.  It is a women's health advocacy group that has dedicated itself to providing medical information to poor and rural women in Pakistan. Blue Veins is involved in helping women secure their rights and to be able to contribute to peaceful resolutions of conflict.

About 
Blue Veins works with grassroots organizations for both men and women to secure and maintain women's rights in Khyber Pakthtunkhwa (KPK). This has included ensuring women have the right to vote in Peshawar. Blue Veins has also trained women on how to avoid harassment in the workplace.

Blue Veins has also helped transgender people in Pakistan. They have provided help and resources, such as giving out sewing machines to individuals in the transgender community.

Blue Veins is a member of the End Violence Against Women & Girls Alliance and also a member of Girls Not Brides.

History 
Blue Veins was founded by Qamar Naseem in 1999 first in order to spread information about breast cancer in communities such as Khyber Pakthtunkhwa (KPK) and Federally Administrated Tribal Areas (FATA). In 2013, Blue Veins partnered with KIOS, a Finnish NGO, to document sexual harassment "hotspots" in Pakistan. This project eventually led to 46 women being able to file cases, with Blue Veins' help. Also in 2013, Blue Veins launched a "Women's Manifesto", urging women to exercise their right to vote.

Blue Veins helped establish TransAction in KPK. In 2017, Blue Veins, along with TransAction Alliance have demanded legal protections for transgender people in KPK. KPK became the first province in South Asia to have legal protections for transgender people.

See also 

 Women related laws in Pakistan

References

External links 
 Official site

Women's rights organisations based in Pakistan
Organizations established in 1999
Medical and health organisations based in Pakistan
Organizations that support LGBT people
1999 establishments in Pakistan